Hans Wiedemann is a German sprint canoeist who competed in the late 1930s. He won a silver medal in the C-1 1000 m event at the 1938 ICF Canoe Sprint World Championships in Vaxholm, Sweden.

References

German male canoeists
Possibly living people
Year of birth missing
ICF Canoe Sprint World Championships medalists in Canadian